The Columbia River Inter-Tribal Fish Commission (CRITFC) is a fishery resource for the treaty tribes of the Columbia River. Under the treaty, the native tribes, The Nez Perce Tribe, Warm Springs Reservation Tribe, and Umatilla Indian Reservation Tribe, have to the right to fish in the Columbia River, which means their fishery must be reserve and protect.

History 
As stated in The First Oregonians, "The Yakama Nation, the Confederated Tribes of Warm Springs, the Confederated Tribes of the Umatilla Indian Reservation, and the Nez Perce Tribe, who reserved the rights to fish under 1855 treaties with the United States, found CRITFC in 1977.”  Their members may fish at all usual and accustomed fishing locations in the Columbia River Basin. The rights includes ceremonial, subsistence, and commercial fisheries.

In an article by Government Innovators Network, Innovations Harvard in 1977 the tribes of Yakama, Umatilla, Nez Perce, and Warm Springs decided to converge together because of the growing problem of salmon not being restored. This was because the federal and state government for over 100 years have been using salmon as something to mass harvest than to protect. This group that collaborated created what's known as the Columbia River Inter- Tribal Fish Commission (CRITFC). Their main goal is to look at salmon as not to be seen as something of natural resource to be used at such a big project, but to have them be restored and saved for the tribes, and people in the Pacific Northwest. The CRITFC first had to go through multiple steps in order to create the commission such as fundraising, fish management, habitat restoration, and many more steps. Currently in Portland Oregon is where their headquarters is located, and is directed by members of the four tribes. CRITFC has much strength when it comes to how they operate including the many programs that are utilized such as fishery management.

What Does (CRITFC) Do To Create Change 
According to CRITFC's website here are examples of how they have made an impact. Starting from the early years of 1977 up to around 2012 they have made many accomplishments, and have plans set to continue what they started. Some examples in the early years of change include in 1986 CRITFC had a successful lawsuit to make no new hydropower in areas that the Commission deemed to be a protected area for salmon. A couple years later in 1988 a plan was signed to protect a very important run of fall chinook. In 1994 there was training brought to youth, and adults to help create a better environment for salmon. They did this by planting tree's to help regulate water temperature, and create erosion resistant banks, as well as checking water temperature, and observing data. In 2011 the Condit Dam was removed because it was blocking passage to fish that before the dam was there had been traveling upstream to spawn. The removal of this dam not only helped with temperature of the water to be more regulated, but opened up passage for fish to travel further upstream to their natural spawning grounds the salmon may have used for thousands of years. CRITFC has been well involved with obtaining people in professional fields suited for the creation of better habitats for salmon. These fields involve biologists, lawyers, hydrologists, and public relations.

Future Plans For CRITFC 
CRITFC has been very involved in restoring salmon habitat over the past 40 years, and it's just getting started. Plans for future involve making sure that the federal government have reduced funding for anything that may set back CRITFC for their hard efforts of protecting, and helping the growth and return of salmon. There is an issue of contamination in the Columbia River Basin that the commission plans to find a way to exterminate the toxic chemicals that are in the river.

Fish Market 
In order to assist the tribal fishers to maintain their traditions and supplement their incomes, CRITFC promoted “direct-to-public” sales at fishing sites, that were built by the U.S. Army Corps of Engineers, in the Columbia River. CRITFC is currently encourages fishers to participate through a fisher marketing project of the Chef's Collaborative called Fish-Chef Connection. CRITFC and Ecotrust is working with Food Innovation Center on a value-added products for tule fish, which are low-end, white-fleshed fish that usually, after market, left over. With the ability to create a value-added product, it is likely that fisher's income will raise after fishing season. According to The First Oregonians, “The Columbia River Inter-Fish Commission estimates that for every ten dollars generated by fish sales, as much as seven dollars is contributed to local economies.”

Dioxin Discover 
A survey was conducted to the Environment Protection Agency (EPA) and revealed that tribal members who caught and consumed fish near the Columbia River Intern-Tribe Fish Commission may be at a higher risk of toxin disease because they consume more fish than most people in America. Because of these concerns, the EPA worked with CRITFC to investigate the fish consumption between 1990 and 1991 and found out that the entire Columbia River in Oregon, and the Snake River in Washington, contained toxic chemical produces. The reason why it was contaminated was because of industrial polluters. Since the big revelation, CRITFC and EPA partnered with other agencies and find existing toxins in the river while helping native tribe members who got infected by the toxins.

References 

 Berg, L. (2007). The first Oregonians. Portland, OR: Oregon Council for the Humanities.
 University of Oregon, K. (n.d.). Spilyay tymoo. (WARM springs, OR.) 1976-current, October 14, 1994, image 1. Retrieved March 14, 2021

Columbia River